Jan Bašta  (5 June 1860 in Poděbrady - 12 October 1936 in Prague) was a famous Czech engineer, writer, and researcher. He became director of Czech railways in 1918.

External links
 Literature of and about Jan Bašta in the German National Library

Czech engineers
Czech male writers
1860 births
1936 deaths
Czechoslovak engineers